Tukhani is the name of several rural localities in Russia:
Tukhani, Novgorod Oblast, a village in Dolgovskoye Settlement of Moshenskoy District of Novgorod Oblast
Tukhani, Tver Oblast, a selo in Sobolinskoye Rural Settlement of Sandovsky District of Tver Oblast